Cutco Corporation, formerly Alcas Corporation, is an American company that sells knives, predominantly through direct sales or multi-level marketing. It is the parent company of CUTCO Cutlery Corp., Vector Marketing, Ka-Bar Knives, and Schilling Forge. Its primary brand is named Cutco.

The company was founded in 1949 by Alcoa and Case Cutlery (hence "Al-cas") to manufacture stainless steel knives for Alcoa's WearEver Cookware division. Alcoa purchased Case's share in the company in 1972, and Alcas became a separate private company in 1982 after a management buyout. In 1985, the company acquired Vector Marketing Corporation.

In early 2009, Alcas changed its name to Cutco, the name of the primary product.

Products 

Cutco is a brand of cutlery and kitchen accessories directly marketed to customers through in-home demonstrations by independent sales representatives who are mostly college students. More than 100 kitchen cutlery products are sold under the Cutco name, as well as a variety of kitchen utensils, cookware, sporting, and outdoor knives.

Although the products are not typically purchased in retail stores, Cutco has opened six of its own retail stores: Indianapolis, Indiana; Okemos, Michigan; St. Louis, Missouri; Novi, Michigan; Edina, Minnesota; and Erie, Pennsylvania. All of the company's knives and most of their other products are produced in Olean, New York, while other products are made in Mexico and China.

Vector Marketing
 

Vector Marketing is Cutco's direct selling subsidiary that builds its sales force through advertising via newspapers, direct marketing, word-of-mouth, posted advertisements, letters, and various media on the internet. The company has been the subject of criticism and lawsuits for its deceptive recruiting and business practices, and has been accused of being a multi-level marketing company. Their fliers advertising "student work" are distributed in many high schools and college campuses across the United States and Canada. Students are hired to sell Cutco products (mainly kitchen knives) to customers, starting with their friends and family, then branching out through recommendations, all through one-on-one demonstrations. While Vector required a deposit on the sample kit representatives were issued in the past, this was changed in 2011, and deposits are no longer required from representatives.

References

External links 
 

Kitchen knife brands
Retail companies established in 1949
Companies based in Cattaraugus County, New York
Multi-level marketing companies
1949 establishments in New York (state)
Knife manufacturing companies